FFDD may refer to:

 Focal facial dermal dysplasia, a rare genetic disorder
 Panama Defense Forces, the former Panamanian military, known in Spanish as Fuerzas de Defensa de Panamá (FFDD)